The Somme American Cemetery and Memorial in Picardie, France, is an American Battle Monuments Commission cemetery, situated ½ mile southwest of the commune of Bony, Aisne in northern France. It is located on a gentle slope typical of the open, rolling Picardy countryside.

Cemetery

The  war cemetery was established in October 1918 on ground which saw heavy fighting just before and during the Battle of St Quentin Canal. It contains the graves of 1,844 of the United States' military dead from World War I. Most lost their lives in the assault on the Hindenburg Line while serving in American II Corps attached to the British Fourth Army. Others were killed in operations near Cantigny. The headstones, set in regular rows, are separated into four plots by paths that intersect at the flagpole near the top of the slope. The longer axis leads to the chapel at the eastern end of the cemetery.

A massive bronze door surmounted by an American eagle leads into the chapel, whose outer walls contain sculptured pieces of military equipment. Once inside, light from a cross-shaped crystal window above the marble altar bathes the subdued interior with light. The walls bear the names of 333 of the missing. Rosettes mark the names of those since recovered and identified.

Notable burials

Medal of Honor recipients
 Robert Lester Blackwell (1895–1918), for action near St. Souplet, France
 Thomas E. O'Shea (1895–1918), for action at Le Catelet, France
 William Bradford Turner (1892–1918), for action at Ronssoy, France

See also

 World War I memorials

References

Further reading

External links

 American Battle Monuments Commission – Somme American Cemetery and Memorial
 
 Association Les Parrains de la Mémoire – France Remembrance Association 

Cemeteries in Hauts-de-France
Buildings and structures in Aisne
World War I memorials in France
World War I cemeteries in France
American Battle Monuments Commission
Tourist attractions in Aisne